The 5th Corps was one of seven corps of the Army of the Republic of Bosnia and Herzegovina. The formation was around the Bihać pocket to protect it against the surrounding Serb forces. The Fifth Corps also fought secessional Bosniak forces loyal to Fikret Abdić, who was cooperating with Serb forces. In the last military action of the ARBiH, Operation Sana, the corps defeated Abdić's supporters and brought a number of regions of Bosnia and Herzegovina under government control. In April 2018, police detained Atif Dudaković and 12 others on suspicion of committing crimes against humanity during the Bosnian war. The court process is still ongoing.

History 
The ministry of military affairs passed the order for the formation of the Fifth Corps of the ARBIH on September 29, 1992 and the final approval by the presidency of Bosnia and Herzegovina (order no. 02-111-738/92) on October 21, 1992. In the formation of the 5th Corps there have been the de-formation of the Unsko-sanski Operative Group and the Territorial Defense of Bihać.

5th Corps command 
Major Hajrudin Osmanagić was given control, but he was eliminated before he took the post and Captain First class Ramiz Dreković took control as commander of the Fifth Corps, thus becoming first commander of the Fifth Corps. After him, Brigadier General Atif Dudaković became commander of the Fifth Corps. He had the most impact of all the generals of the corps.
 
Corps Staff: 28 officers, 2 under-officers, 42 soldiers
1st Commander: Captain I Class Ramiz Dreković - from forming to 1 November 1993
2nd Commander: Brigadier General Atif Dudaković - from 1 November 1993
Deputy Commander Chief of Staff: 
Major Ramiz Duraković 
Major Mirsad Sedić
Assistants for moral IPD and MP - Ejub Topić
Assistants for security - Sakib Butković
Logistic - Bećir Sirovina.

5th Corps units

5th Corps units (in 1995) 
501st Celebrated Mountain Brigade
Commander: Brigadier Senad Šarganović
502nd Knightly Mountain Brigade
Commander: Colonel Hamdija Abdić
503rd Celebrated Mountain Brigade
Commander: Brigadier Muhamed Delalić
505th Knightly Motorized Brigade
Commander: Brigadier Izet Nanić
506th Liberation Brigade
Commander: Major Nijaz Miljković
510th Bosnian-Liberation Brigade
Commander: Brigadier Amir Avdić
511th Celebrated Mountain Brigade
Commander: Major Mirsad Sedić
517th Liberation Brigade
Commander: Major Ibrahim Nadarević
5th Battalion of Military Police
Special forces Detachment 
5th Reconnaissance-Sabotage Company 
5th Tank Company
5th Mixed Artillery Division 
5th Mixed Artillery Regiment 
Mixed Anti-Armored Artillery Division 
5th Artillery-Missile Anti-Aircraft Defense Unit 
Aviation Group Bihać (Branch of ARBiH Air Force) 
5th Atomic-Biological-Chemical-Defense Company
5th Engineering Company 
5th Logistics Base 
5th Corps Training and recruitment Center 
5th Corps Dedicated-Mlitary industry
101st HVO "Ante Knežević - Krpe" (Battalion) 
Commander: Lieutenant-Colonel Grgić

Brigades on the day of formation 
1st Bihać Infantry Brigade
2nd Bihac Muslim-Croat Infantry Brigade
1st Cazin Infantry Brigade
103rd Battlefieldska Brigade
105th Buzim Infantry Brigade
101st Muslim Krajina Brigade
111th Bosanska Krupa Infantry Brigade
1st Velika Kladuša Infantry Brigade

Liberated cities 
Bosanska Krupa
Bosanski Petrovac
Ključ
Sanski Most
Velika Kladuša

References

Corps of the Army of the Republic of Bosnia and Herzegovina